Michel Schneider (28 May 1944 – 21 July 2022) was a French writer, musicologist, énarque, senior official, and psychoanalyst. He was the father of journalist and writer Vanessa Schneider and of François Schneider, history teacher. He was also the maternal uncle of actress Maria Schneider.

Career 
A former student of the École nationale d'administration, he began his career at the Department of Forecasting of the French Ministry of Economy and Finance in 1971. He was appointed adviser to the Court of Audit in 1981. Michel Schneider died in Villejuif on 21 July 2022 at the age of 78.

Académie française 
He obtained ten votes in the election at the Académie Française on February 7, 2008 where he applied to the succession of Bertrand Poirot-Delpech.

Opinions

Same-sex couples marriage

Lesbians and assisted reproductive technology 

In the magazine LGBT , these words have been described as "homophobic, transphobic and misogynistic" as well as "psychoanalytic-reactionary considerations" by Maëlle Le Corre.

Bibliography

Psychoanalysis 
 1980: Blessures de mémoire, Paris, Éditions Gallimard, coll. "Connaissance de l'inconscient".
 1985: Voleurs de mots : essai sur le plagiat, la psychanalyse et la pensée, Paris, Gallimard, series "Connaissance de l'inconscient", .
 2010: Lacan, les années fauve, Paris, PUF, series "Fil Rouge".

Narratives 
 1990: Bleu passé, Gallimard

Novels 
 1991: Je crains de lui parler la nuit, Gallimard
 2011: Comme une ombre, Grasset

On music 
 2001: Prima donna, 
 2011:

Biographical essays 
 1988: Glenn Gould, piano solo : aria et trente variations, Gallimard, series "L'un et l'autre" . 
 1989: La Tombée du jour : Schuman, Le Seuil, series "La librairie du XX" . 
 1991: Un rêve de pierre : le Radeau de la méduse : Géricault, Gallimard
 1999: Maman, Paris, Gallimard, series "L'un et l'autre" 
 2003: Morts imaginaires, Gallimard . Prix Médicis essai 2003
 2005: Schumann : Les voix intérieures, Paris, Gallimard, coll. "Découvertes Gallimard" (nº 481), .
 2006: Marilyn, dernières séances, Grasset, . Prix Interallié 2006.
 2014: L'Auteur, l'autre : Proust et son double, Gallimard

Political and sociological reflections 
 1993: La Comédie de la culture, Le Seuil,
 2003: Big Mother, Odile Jacob, 
 2007: La Confusion des sexes, Groupe Flammarion, series "Café Voltaire" 
 2013: Miroir des princes, Flammarion, series "Café Voltaire"

Prizes 
 2007: 2nd Globes de Cristal Award: best novel Marylin, dernière séance

References

External links 
 Michel Schneider on Wikiquote
 « Les Grandes traversées / Moi, Marilyn » on France Culture
 Michel Schneider on Babelio
 Michel Schneider à la recherche du frère perdu on Paris Match (20 September 2011)
 Maman de Michel Schneider by Andrée Bauduin on CAIRN
 Miche Schneider 's articles on Le Point
 Michel Schneider – Le cauchemar américain on Le Point
 Toi, le frère que j'ai vraiment eu on Le Monde (1 September 2011)
 
 

1944 births
2022 deaths
20th-century French non-fiction writers
21st-century French non-fiction writers
20th-century French musicologists
21st-century French musicologists
French psychoanalysts
École nationale d'administration alumni
Prix Médicis essai winners
Prix Interallié winners
People from Seine-et-Marne
Judges of the Court of Audit (France)
French anti-same-sex-marriage activists